The retina is a light-sensitive layer of tissue, lining the inner surface of the eye.

Retina may also refer to:

Kodak Retina, a series of cameras made from 1936 to 1969
Retina Display, brand names used by Apple Inc. for screens with a high pixel density
Retina (film), a 2017 American thriller film
Retina (or More Fun Than a Vat of Love), a 2010 album by How to Swim
 Retina (software), a network vulnerability scanner application

See also
Ratina (disambiguation)
Retinal, a form of vitamin A